Ziziphora are a genus of annual or perennial herbs or subshrubs in the family Lamiaceae. Ziziphora has aromatic leaves; they are found in open and often xeric habitats in Southern and Eastern Europe, North-West Africa and Asia to the Himalayas and Altai mountains.

Distribution
 Southwestern Europe
 Southeastern Europe
 Eastern Europe
 Northern Africa
 Macaronesia
 Siberia
 Middle Asia
 Caucasus
 Western Asia
 Arabian Peninsula
 China
 Mongolia
 Indian Subcontinent
 Iran (north khorasan)

Species
 Ziziphora aragonensis Pau - Spain 
 Ziziphora brantii  K.Koch - Caucasus 
 Ziziphora capitata  L. - Balkans, Black Sea region, Middle East, Central Asia 
 Ziziphora clinopodioides Lam. - Siberia, Mongolia, Xinjiang, Central Asia, Himalayas, Southwest Asia 
 Ziziphora galinae Juz. - Turkmenistan 
 Ziziphora hispanica L. - Spain, Algeria, Morocco, Tunisia 
 Ziziphora interrupta Juz. - Tajikistan 
 Ziziphora pamiroalaica Juz. - Kyrgyzstan, Tajikistan, Xingjiang  
 Ziziphora pedicellata Pazij & Vved. - Kyrgyzstan, Uzbekistan 
 Ziziphora persica  Bunge - Iran, Turkey, Caucasus, Crimea, Central Asia 
 Ziziphora puschkinii Adam - Caucasus 
 Ziziphora raddei Juz. - Caucasus  
 Ziziphora suffruticosa Pazij & Vved. - Uzbekistan 
 Ziziphora taurica M.Bieb - Crimea, Turkey, Syria 
 Ziziphora tenuior L. - Ukraine, Russia, Siberia, Central Asia, Xinjiang, Afghanistan, Iran, Turkey, Middle East 
 Ziziphora vichodceviana Tkatsch. ex Tulyag. - Kyrgyzstan 
 Ziziphora woronowii Maleev - Caucasus

References

 
Lamiaceae genera